Fossa Magna is a great rift lowland in Japan. It is often confused with Itoigawa-Shizuoka Tectonic Line. However, Itoigawa-Shizuoka Tectonic Line is a line; Fossa Magna is an area. Fossa Magna is Latin for "great crevasse". This name was given by Heinrich Edmund Naumann.

Fossa Magna Museum 
Fossa Magna Museum is a museum that is located in Itoigawa, Niigata Prefecture. It opened on April 25, 1994. It is part of Itoigawa UNESCO Global Geopark. Itoigawa is located directly above Itoigawa-Shizuoka Tectonic Line and is a place where you can observe a wide variety of rocks, minerals, geological structures and so on. In addition, There is Fossa Magna Park in Itoigawa.

References 

Landforms of Japan
Geology of Japan